"Dernière danse" (English: "Last dance") is a song recorded by French singer-songwriter Indila. It served as the first single from her debut album, Mini World.

Music video

Background and synopsis 
The music video was released on 5 December 2013.

Lyric video 
A lyric video was uploaded on the artist's Vevo channel simultaneously on the release day of the song.

Chart performance 
On 1 March 2014, it entered the Greek charts at number-one and spent seven weeks at number one. On 19 April 2014, it was knocked down to No. 2 by Pharrell Williams' Happy. It reclaimed No. 1 the following week, and remained there for another five weeks, totaling at thirteen weeks at No. 1.

Weekly charts

Year-end charts

Certification and sales

Other versions 
 Natacha Andréani performed the song on the third season of the French version of The Voice.
 "Anno 1800 Soundtrack - The Rains" - Composed by Armin Haas, Dynamedion for Anno 1800.
In 2021, Shanguy, Yves V and Alex Cooper released a cover of the song.

References 

2013 songs
2013 debut singles
French-language songs
Number-one singles in Greece
Number-one singles in Israel
Number-one singles in Turkey
Indila songs